Desire for Agony is a 1993 album by Japanese noise rock band Zeni Geva.  It was recorded in September 1993 at The Basement in Chicago, Illinois and was produced by Steve Albini.

Track listing
All tracks written by Zeni Geva.

Personnel
Zeni Geva
 KK Null – vocals, guitar, design
 Tabata – guitar
 Eito – drums

Additional personnel
 Steve Albini – production, engineering
 Mark Fischer – cover painting
 Hiroko Shirasaki – photography

References

1993 albums
Zeni Geva albums
Albums produced by Steve Albini
Alternative Tentacles albums
Japanese rock music groups
Noise rock albums by Japanese artists